Cape Fiske is a cape which forms the eastern tip of Smith Peninsula, on the east coast of Palmer Land, Antarctica. This cape was photographed from the air by members of the US Antarctic Service in December 1940, and in 1947 by members of the Ronne Antarctic Research Expedition under Finn Ronne, who in conjunction with the Falkland Islands Dependencies Survey charted it from the ground. It was named by Ronne for C.O. Fiske, a climatologist with the Ronne expedition.

References 

Headlands of Palmer Land